Tut may refer to:


People
 Tutankhamun, an Egyptian pharaoh often referred to as "King Tut"
 Bernard Bartzen (born 1927), American tennis player nicknamed "Tut"
 Tut Imlay (1902–1976), National Football League player (1926–1927)
 Tut Taylor (born 1923), American bluegrass musician
 Tin Tut (1895–1945), first foreign minister of the Union of Burma

Places
Tut, Iran (disambiguation), various villages
Tut, Turkey, a district
Tut (river), Mizoram, India

Other uses
 TUT (disambiguation)
 Dental click, a sound used to express disapproval in English, often spelled as "tut" or "tsk"
 Tut (miniseries), a Spike miniseries about Tutankhamun
 Tut or Thout, the first month of the ancient Egyptian and Coptic calendars
 ISO 639 code for the proposed language family of Altaic languages
 Truncated tetrahedron, a polyhedron

See also 
 King Tut (disambiguation)
 Tuts Washington (1907–1984), American Louisiana blues pianist